Kumradol railway station is an Indian railway station on the Dumka–Bhagalpur line of the Sahibganj loop of the Malda railway division in the Eastern Railway zone. The station is situated at Kumradol in Godda district in the Indian state of Jharkhand.

History
The metre-gauge railway track from Bhagalpur Junction railway station to Mandar Hill railway station branch was opened in 1907. The branch was converted to broad gauge. A new railway line from Mandar Hill to Hansdiha became operational on 23 December 2012 and the Dumka to Barapalasi route was reconstructed in June 2014. The full track finally became operational in 2015.

References

Malda railway division
Railway stations in Godda district